Soros Sukhum is a Thai film producer.

Partial filmography
Diamond Island (film) (2016)
Pop Aye (2017)
Ten Years Thailand (2018)
Memoria (To be released)

Awards
 2018 Silpathorn Award in Film
 2020 FIAPF Award

References

Living people
Soros Sukhum
Soros Sukhum
Year of birth missing (living people)